Paistu Parish was a rural municipality of Estonia, in Viljandi County.

After the local government council elections held on 20 October 2013, Paistu Parish was merged with Pärsti, Saarepeedi and Viiratsi parishes to form a new Viljandi Parish around the town of Viljandi.

On 1 January 2009, it had a population of 1,622 and an area of 128.59 km2.

Settlements
Villages
Aidu - Hendrikumõisa - Holstre - Intsu - Kassi - Lolu - Loodi - Luiga - Mustapali - Paistu - Pirmastu - Pulleritsu - Rebase - Sultsi - Tömbi - Viisuküla

Notable people 
 Ernst Reinhold von Hofmann, geologist and mineralogist

References

External links
 

Paistu Parish
Geography of Viljandi County